This article lists publishers of manga in various markets worldwide.

Chinese

Traditional Chinese
 Daran Comics (or Daran Culture Enterprise) (defunct) (Taiwan) 
 Kadokawa Comics Taiwan (Taiwan)
 Tong Li Comics (Taiwan)
 Ever Glory Publishing (Taiwan) 
 Sharp Point Publishing (Taiwan)
 King Comics Hong Kong (Hong Kong)
 Culturecom Comics (Hong Kong) 
 Jade Dynasty (Hong Kong)
 Jonesky (Hong Kong)
 Kwong's Creations Co Ltd
 Rightman Publishing Ltd

Simplified Chinese
 21st Century Publishing House (二十一世纪出版社集团) (China)
Changchun Publishing House (China)
 ChuangYi Publishing (Singapore) 
 WitiComics (Hong Kong)

Czech 

 Crew

Danish
 Alpha Entertainment
 Carlsen manga
 Egmont Serieforlaget
 Mangismo

Dutch
 Glenat 
 Kana 
 Xtra

English

Active (digital & print)
 Ablaze Publishing
 Animate
 Antarctic Press
 Bento Books
 Black Hook Press
 Blaft Publications
 Blast Books
 BookLOUD Inc.
 Breakdown Press
 B4 Media Inc
 Comix India
 Dark Horse Manga
 DC Comics
 Denpa
 DH Publishing
 Digital Manga Publishing
 Drawn & Quarterly
 Dream manga
 Eros Comix
 Fakku
 Fantagraphics
 Glacier Bay Books
 GuiltPleasure
 HarperCollins
 Image Comics
 IDW Publishing
J-Novel Club
 Kaiten Books
 Kitty Media
 Kodansha USA
 kuš!
 Last Gasp Publishing
 Manga Planet
 Madman Entertainment
 Marvel Comics
 NBM Publishing
 Netcomics
 No Starch Press
 One Peace Books
 Ponent Mon
 Seishin Ink
 Seven Seas Entertainment
 Shogakukan Asia
 Star Fruit Books
 Stone Bridge Press
 SuBLime
 Retrofit Comics
 The Right Stuf International
 Titan Books
 Tokyopop
 Top Shelf Productions
 Udon Entertainment
 Vertical Inc
 VIZ Media
 Yaoi Press
 Yen Press

Active (digital content only)
 2D Market
 Azuki
 Comikey
 comiXology
 Crunchyroll
 eigoMANGA
 futekiya (Boys' Love manga subscription)
 INKR Comics 
 Irodori Comics
 Manga Box
 Manga Plus 
 MangaMagazine.net
 Mangamo
 Net Comics
 Otome's Way
 P2 Manga Publishing
 Pocket Comics
 Star Fruit Books

Defunct
 ADV Manga
 ALC Publishing
 Aurora Publishing
 Bamboo Press
 Bandai Entertainment
 Broccoli Books
 Central Park Media
 Chuang Yi
 ComicsOne
 Creation Books
 Del Rey Manga
 Deux
 Doujins Unlimited
 DramaQueen
 DrMaster
 Gen Manga Entertainment
 Go! Comi
 Gutsoon! Entertainment
 Icarus Publishing
 ICEkunion
 Infinity Studios
 JManga 
 Kitty Media
 Media Blasters
 PictureBox
 Redlight Manga
 Sol Press
 Studio Ironcat
 wirepop

Finnish
 Editorial Ivrea
 Egmont Kustannus
 Kustannus Jalava
 Like Kustannus 
 Pauna Media Group
 Punainen jättiläinen
 Sangatsu Manga

French
 Ankama
 Akata/Delcourt
 Asuka
 Atomic Club (defunct)
 Casterman
 Delcourt
 Doki-Doki (Bamboo Édition)
 Dybex (retired from the manga market in 2006) (Belgium)
 Editions H
 Editions Muffins
 Shuppan Manga
 Gekko
 Glénat
 J'ai lu (retired from the manga market in 2006)
 Kabuto
 Kami
 Kana
 Kazé
 Ki-oon
 Kurokawa
 Panini Manga
 Pika Édition
 Ototo
 Samji
 SeeBD (defunct)
 Shogun City
 Soleil
 Taïfu Comics
 Tonkam
 Tartamudo 
 Végétal Manga Shoten became Vegetal Shuppan in 2006

Japanese
 Akane Shinsha
 Akita Shoten
 Asahi Sonorama
 ASCII Media Works
 Bungeishunjū
 Bushiroad
 Chuokoron-Shinsha
 Coamix
 Core Magazine
 Daitosha
 Earth Star Entertainment
 Enterbrain
 Flex Comix
 Fujimi Shobo
 Fusosha 
 Futabasha
 Gakken
 Gentosha
 Hakusensha
 Hayakawa Shoten
 Houbunsha
 Ichijinsha
 Issuisya
 Kadokawa Shoten
 Kaiohsha
 Kawade Shobō Shinsha
 Kill Time Communication
 Kobunsha
 Kodansha
 Kubo Shoten 
 Libre
 Mag Garden
 MediaWorks
 Media Factory 
 Nihon Bungeisha
 Ohta Publishing
 Ohzora Publishing
 Papyless
 Sansai Books
 Shinchosha
 Shinshokan
 Shobunkan
 Shodensha
 Shogakukan
 Shōnen Gahōsha
 Shueisha
 Shufu to Seikatsu Sha 
 Softgarage
 Square Enix
 Takeshobo
 Team Ninja
 Tokodo
 Tokuma Shoten
 Tokyo Sogensha
 Ushio Shuppan
 Wani Books
 Wanimagazine

German
 Carlsen Comics
 Tokyopop
 Egmont Manga & Anime
 Panini Comics
 Kazé
 Altraverse
 Manga Cult
 Heyne Manga
 Schreiber & Leser
 Schwarzer Turm
 Butter & Cream
 J-Store
 Cursed Side
 Studio-izm
 Fireangels
 MangaSutra
 Epsilon Verlag
 Dojinshi

Hungarian
 Mangafan
 Mangattack
 Fumax

Indonesian
 Acolyte Inc.
 3Lancar Comics
 Elex Media Komputindo
 Erlangga
 Level Comics
 M&C Comics

Italian
 001 Edizioni through the Hikari Edizioni publishing division
 Coconino Press
 Disney Manga
 Dynit
 Flashbook
 Goen
 Hazard Edizioni
 Edizioni BD through the J-POP publishing division
 Kappa Edizioni
 Magic Press
 Panini Comics through the Planet Manga publishing division
 Star Comics (Italy)
 Yamato Edizioni

Defunct
 Comic Art
 d/visual
 Free Books
 GP Publishing
 Planeta DeAgostini
 PlayPress
 Ronin Manga
 Shin Vision

Malay
 Art Square Group
 Comics House
 Tora Aman
 Superior Comics
 Komik Remaja
 Arena
 Umbra
 PCM comics
 Manga Boom

Polish
 Japonica Polonica Fantastica (since 1996)
 Waneko (since 1999)
 Hanami (since 2006)
 Studio JG (since 2007)
 Kotori (since 2012)
 Dango (since 2015)
 Akuma (since 2020)

Defunct

 Yumegari (since 2012 - 2019)
 Taiga (2013 - 2015)
 Saisha (2003 - 2005)
 Kasen (2002 - 2008)
 Ringo Ame (2014-2016)
 Okami (2016-2018)
 Red Sun (2015-2018)
 Mandragora (2001 - 2008)
 Egmont (still active but no longer as manga publisher)

Portuguese

Brazil
 Editora JBC
 Estúdio Armon
 Panini Comics
 NewPop Editora
 Devir Manga Brasil
 Darkside Books
 Nova Sampa
 Editora Abril
 Editora Veneta
 Pipoca & Nanquim

Defunct
 Conrad Editora
 Editora L&PM
 Editora Alto Astal
 Editora Animangá
 Editora Escala

Portugal
 Editora Devir
 Sendai Editora
 Midori Editora

Defunct
 ASA
 JBC Portugal
 Levoir
 Mangaline Edicões
 Meribérica/Líber
 Planeta DeAgostini
 Texto Editora

Russian
 Comics Factory
 Comix-ART
 Sakura Press
 Eksmo
 AST (publisher)
 Alt Graph
 XL Media
 Istari Comics Publishing
 PalmaPress
 RIM

Spanish

Argentina
 Editorial Ivrea
 Editorial OVNI Press
 Panini Comics Argentina
 Utopía Editorial
 Kemuri Ediciones
 Planeta Comic
 Editorial Pop Fiction
 Distrito Manga Argentina

Defunct
 LARP Editores 
 Camelot Mikoshi
 Deuxstudio Editorial
 J-Pop Arg
 Editoral Conosur
 ECC Argentina
 Buen Gusto Ediciones

Chile
 MangaLine Chile
 Distrito Manga Chile

Colombia
 Distrito Manga Colombia

Mexico
 Panini Comics México
Editorial Kamite
Mangaline Mexico

Defunct
 Editorial Vid México
 Editorial Toukan
 Smash Manga

Peru
 Templu Comics
 Hanami Editorial
 Mangaline Perú

Spain
 Norma Editorial
 Planeta DeAgostini
 Editorial Ivrea
 Milky Way Ediciones
Ediciones Babylon
 ECC Ediciones
 Panini Comics España
 Tomodomo Ediciones
 Letrablanka Editorial
 Mangaline España
 Astiberri
 Ponent Mon
 La Cupula
 Herder
 Fandogamia Editorial
 Gallonero
 RandomHouse Mondadori
 Quaterni
 Yowu Entertainment
 DKO

Defunct
 Editores de Tebeos (former Glenat)
 Ediciones Mangaline
 Ediciones Mangaland

Swedish
 Bonnier Carlsen
 Egmont Kärnan
 Ordbilder Media
 Nosebleed Studio

Tamil
 Ranglee Publications

Thai
Phoenix Next
Vibulkij Comics
Nida Publishing
Nation Edutainment
Comics Publications Co., Ltd.
Bongkoch
Siam Inter Comics
luckpim publishing
ANIMAG Comics
Dexpress
Zenshu Comics (Rose Media and Entertainment)

Ukrainian
 Molfar Comics
 Nasha idea

Vietnamese
 Kim Dong Publishing House
 Tre Publishing House
 TVM Comics (defunct)
 IPM
 Uranix
 Skybooks
 Amak
 Mori Manga
 Daisy Comics

See also
List of comics publishing companies
List of manga distributors

External links
 manga.about.com List of US and Japanese Manga publishers

Manga
Manga industry
Manga publishers